Augustus II (12 May 16701 February 1733), most commonly known as Augustus the Strong, was Elector of Saxony from 1694 as well as King of Poland and Grand Duke of Lithuania in the years 1697–1706 and from 1709 until his death in 1733. He belonged to the Albertine line of the House of Wettin.

Augustus' great physical strength earned him the nicknames "the Strong", "the Saxon Hercules" and "Iron-Hand". He liked to show that he lived up to his name by breaking horseshoes with his bare hands and engaging in fox tossing by holding the end of his sling with just one finger while two of the strongest men in his court held the other end. He is also notable for fathering a very large number of children.

In order to be elected king of the Polish–Lithuanian Commonwealth, Augustus converted to Roman Catholicism. As a Catholic, he received the Order of the Golden Fleece from the Holy Roman Emperor and established the Order of the White Eagle, Poland's highest distinction. As Elector of Saxony, he is perhaps best remembered as a patron of the arts and architecture. He transformed the Saxon capital of Dresden into a major cultural centre, attracting artists from across Europe to his court. Augustus also amassed an impressive art collection and built lavish baroque palaces in Dresden and Warsaw. In 1717 he served as the Imperial vicar of the Holy Roman Empire.

His reigns brought Poland some troubled times. He led the Polish–Lithuanian Commonwealth in the Great Northern War, which allowed the Russian Empire to strengthen its influence in Europe, especially within Poland. His main pursuit was bolstering royal power in the Commonwealth, characterized by broad decentralization in comparison with other European monarchies. He tried to accomplish this goal using foreign powers and thus destabilized the state. Augustus ruled Poland with an interval; in 1704 the Swedes installed nobleman Stanisław Leszczyński as king, who officially reigned from 1706 to 1709 and after Augustus' death in 1733 which sparked the War of the Polish Succession.

Augustus' body was buried in Poland's royal Wawel Cathedral in Kraków, but his heart rests in the Dresden Cathedral. His only legitimate son, Augustus III of Poland, became king in 1733.

Early life
Augustus was born in Dresden on 12 May 1670, the younger son of John George III, Elector of Saxony and Princess Anna Sophie of Denmark. As the second son, Augustus had no expectation of inheriting the electorate, since his older brother, Johann Georg IV, assumed the post after the death of their father on 12 September 1691. Augustus was well educated, and spent some years in travel and in fighting against France.

Augustus married Kristiane Eberhardine of Brandenburg-Bayreuth in Bayreuth on 20 January 1693. They had a son, Frederick Augustus II (1696–1763), who succeeded his father as Elector of Saxony and King of Poland as Augustus III.

While in Venice during the carnival season, his older brother, the Elector Johann Georg IV, contracted smallpox from his mistress Magdalena Sibylla of Neidschutz. On 27 April 1694, Johann Georg died without legitimate issue and Augustus became Elector of Saxony, as Friedrich Augustus I.

Conversion to Catholicism
To be eligible for election to the throne of the Polish–Lithuanian Commonwealth in 1697, Augustus had to convert to Roman Catholicism. The Saxon dukes had traditionally been called "champions of the Reformation". Saxony had been a stronghold of German Protestantism and Augustus' conversion was therefore considered shocking in Protestant Europe. Although the prince-elector guaranteed Saxony's religious status quo, Augustus' conversion alienated many of his Protestant subjects. As a result of the enormous expenditure of money used to bribe the Polish nobility and clergy, Augustus' contemporaries derisively referred to the Saxon duke's royal ambitions as his "Polish adventure".

His church policy within the Holy Roman Empire followed orthodox Lutheranism and ran counter to his new-found religious and absolutist convictions. The Protestant princes of the empire and the two remaining Protestant electors (of Hanover and Prussia) were anxious to keep Saxony well-integrated in their camp. According to the Peace of Augsburg, Augustus theoretically had the right to re-introduce Roman Catholicism (see Cuius regio, eius religio), or at least grant full religious freedom to his fellow Catholics in Saxony, but this never happened. Saxony remained Lutheran and the few Roman Catholics residing in Saxony lacked any political or civil rights. In 1717, it became clear just how awkward the situation was: to realize his ambitious dynastic plans in Poland and Germany, it was necessary for Augustus' heirs to become Roman Catholic. After five years as a convert, his son—the future Augustus III—publicly avowed his Roman Catholicism. The Saxon Estates were outraged and revolted as it became clear that his conversion to Catholicism was not only a matter of form, but of substance as well.

Since the Peace of Westphalia, the Elector of Saxony had been the director of the Protestant body in the Reichstag. To placate the other Protestant states in the Empire, Augustus nominally delegated the directorship of the Protestant body to Johann Adolf II, Duke of Saxe-Weissenfels. However, when the Elector's son also converted to Catholicism, the Electorate faced a hereditary Catholic succession instead of a return to a Protestant Elector upon Augustus's death. When the conversion became public in 1717, Brandenburg-Prussia and Hanover attempted to oust Saxony from the directorship and appoint themselves as joint directors, but they gave up the attempt in 1720. Saxony would retain the directorship of the Protestant body in the Reichstag until the dissolution of the Holy Roman Empire in 1806, despite the fact that all remaining Electors of Saxony were Catholic.

The wife of Augustus, the Electress Christiane Eberhardine, refused to follow her husband's example and remained a staunch Protestant. She did not attend her husband's coronation in Poland and led a rather quiet life outside Dresden, gaining some popularity for her stubbornness.

King of Poland for the first time

Following the death of Polish King John III Sobieski and having converted to Catholicism, Augustus won election as King of the Polish–Lithuanian Commonwealth in 1697 with the backing of Imperial Russia and Austria, which financed him through the banker Berend Lehmann. At the time, some questioned the legality of Augustus' elevation, since another candidate, François Louis, Prince of Conti, had received more votes. Each candidate, Conti and Augustus, was proclaimed as king by a different ecclesiastical authority: (the Primate Michaŀ Radziejowski proclaimed Conti and the bishop of Kujawy, Stanisław Dąmbski proclaimed Augustus, with Jacob Heinrich von Flemming swearing to the pacta conventa as Augustus's proxy). However, Augustus hurried to the Commonwealth with a Saxon army, while Conti stayed in France for two months.

Although he had led the imperial troops against Turkey in 1695 and 1696 without very much success, Augustus continued the war of the Holy League against Turkey, and after a campaign in Moldavia, his Polish army eventually defeated the Tatar expedition in the Battle of Podhajce in 1698. This victory compelled the Ottoman Empire to sign the Treaty of Karlowitz in 1699. Podolia and Kamieniec Podolski returned to Poland. An ambitious ruler, Augustus hoped to make the Polish throne hereditary within his family, and to use his resources as Elector of Saxony to impose some order on the chaotic Polish–Lithuanian Commonwealth. He was, however, soon distracted from his internal reform projects by the possibility of external conquest. He formed an alliance with Denmark's Frederick IV and Russia's Peter I to strip Sweden's young King Charles XII (Augustus' cousin) of his possessions. Poland's reward for participation in the Great Northern War was to have been the Swedish territory of Livonia. Charles proved an able military commander, however, quickly forcing the Danes out of the war and then driving back the Russians at Narva in 1700, thereby allowing him to focus on the struggle with Augustus. However, this war ultimately proved as disastrous for Sweden as for Poland.

Charles defeated Augustus' army at Riga in July 1701, forcing the Polish-Saxon army to withdraw from Livonia, and followed this up with an invasion of Poland. He captured Warsaw on 14 May 1702, defeated the Polish-Saxon army again at the Battle of Kliszów (July 1702), and took Kraków. He defeated another of Augustus' armies under the command of Generalfeldmarschall Adam Heinrich von Steinau at the Battle of Pułtusk in spring 1703, and besieged and captured Toruń.

By this time, Augustus was certainly ready for peace, but Charles felt that he would be more secure if he could establish someone with whom he had more influence on the Polish throne. In 1704 the Swedes installed Stanisław Leszczyński and tied the commonwealth to Sweden, which compelled Augustus to initiate military operations in Poland alongside Russia (an alliance was concluded in Narva in summer 1704). The resulting civil war in Poland (1704-1706) and the Grodno campaign (1705-1706) did not go well for Augustus. Following the Battle of Fraustadt, on 1 September 1706, Charles invaded Saxony, forcing Augustus to yield the Polish throne to Leszczyński by the Treaty of Altranstädt (October 1706).

Meanwhile, Russia's Tsar Peter had reformed his army, and he dealt a crippling defeat to the Swedes at the Battle of Poltava (1709). This spelled the end of the Swedish Empire and the rise of the Russian Empire.

King of Poland for the second time

The weakened Polish–Lithuanian Commonwealth soon came to be regarded as almost a protectorate of Russia. In 1709 Augustus II returned to the Polish throne under Russian auspices. Once again he attempted to establish an absolute monarchy in the Polish–Lithuanian Commonwealth, but was faced with opposition from the nobility (szlachta, see Tarnogród Confederation). He was handicapped by the mutual jealousy of the Saxons and the Poles, and a struggle broke out in Poland which was only ended when the king promised to limit the number of his army in that country to 18,000 men. Peter the Great seized on the opportunity to pose as mediator, threatened the Commonwealth militarily, and in 1717 forced Augustus and the nobility to sign an accommodation favorable to Russian interests, at the Silent Sejm (Sejm Niemy).

For the remainder of his reign, in an uneasy relationship, Augustus was more or less dependent on Russia (and to a lesser extent, on Austria) to maintain his Polish throne. He gave up his dynastic ambitions and concentrated instead on attempts to strengthen the Commonwealth. Faced with both internal and foreign opposition, however, he achieved little. In 1729 he established the Grand Musketeers Company in Dresden, one of the oldest Polish officers' schools, which in 1730 was relocated to Warsaw.

Augustus died at Warsaw in 1733. Although he had failed to make the Polish throne hereditary in his house, his eldest son, Frederick Augustus II of Saxony, did succeed him to the Polish throne as Augustus III of Poland—although he had to be installed by the Russian army in the War of the Polish Succession.

Legacy

Augustus II and the arts

Augustus is perhaps best remembered as a patron of the arts and architecture. He had beautiful palaces built in Dresden, a city that became renowned for extraordinary cultural brilliance. He introduced the first public museums, such as the Green Vault in 1723, and started systematic collection of paintings that are now on display in the Old Masters Gallery.

From 1687 to 1689, Augustus toured France and Italy. The extravagant court in Versailles—perfectly tailored to fit the needs of an absolute monarch—impressed him deeply. In accordance with the spirit of the baroque age, Augustus invested heavily in the representative splendor of Dresden Castle, his major residence, to advertise his wealth and power.

With strict building regulations, major urban development plans, and a certain feeling for art, the king began to transform Dresden into a renowned cultural center with one of Germany's finest art collections, though most of the city's famous sights and landmarks were completed during the reign of his son Augustus III. The most famous building started under Augustus the Strong was the Zwinger. Also known are Pillnitz Castle, his summer residence, Moritzburg Castle and Hubertusburg Castle, his hunting lodges. He greatly expanded the Saxon Palace in Warsaw with the adjacent Saxon Garden, which became the city's oldest public park and one of the first publicly accessible parks in the world. He also expanded the Wilanów Palace.

He granted composer Johann Adolph Hasse the title of the Royal-Polish and Electoral-Saxon Kapellmeister in 1731.

A man of pleasure, the king sponsored lavish court balls, Venetian-style balli in maschera, and luxurious court gatherings, games, and garden festivities. His court acquired a reputation for extravagance throughout Europe. He held a famous animal-tossing contest in Dresden at which 647 foxes, 533 hares, 34 badgers and 21 wildcats were tossed and killed. Augustus himself participated, reportedly demonstrating his strength by holding the end of his sling by just one finger, with two of the strongest men in his court on the other end.

Gallery

Meissen porcelain

Augustus II successfully sponsored efforts to discover the secret of manufacturing porcelain. In 1701 he rescued the young alchemist Johann Friedrich Böttger, who had fled from the court of the king of Prussia, Frederick I, who had expected that he produce gold for him as he had boasted he could.

Augustus imprisoned Böttger and tried to force him to reveal the secret of manufacturing gold. Böttger's transition from alchemist to potter was orchestrated as an attempt to avoid the impossible demands of the king. Being an alchemist by profession rather than a potter, gave Böttger an advantage. He realised that the current approaches, which involved mixing fine white substances like crushed egg shells into clay, would not work. Rather, his approach was to attempt to bake clay at higher temperatures than had ever before been attained in European kilns. That approach yielded the breakthrough that had eluded European potters for a century. By the king's decree, the Royal-Polish and Electoral-Saxon Porcelain Manufactory was established in Meissen in 1709. The manufacture of fine porcelain continues at the Meissen porcelain factory.

Order of the White Eagle 

In November 1705 in Tykocin, Augustus founded the Order of the White Eagle, Poland's first and preeminent order of chivalry. In 1723 he bought the Großsedlitz estate near Dresden, and after expanding the palace and garden complex, in 1727 he organized there the first ever festivities of the Order of the White Eagle. In Warsaw, the Saxon Garden (Polish: Ogród Saski) commemorates the role of Augustus II in expanding the city's public places.

Other 

Augustus II was called "the Strong" for his bear-like physical strength and for his numerous offspring (only one of them his legitimate child and heir). The most famous of the king's children born out of wedlock was Maurice de Saxe, a brilliant strategist who attained the highest military ranks in the kingdom of France. In the War of the Polish Succession he remained loyal to his employer Louis XV of France, who was married to the daughter of Augustus's rival Stanisław I Leszczyński.

Augustus II's body was interred in the Wawel Cathedral in Kraków—all but his heart, which rests at the Dresden Cathedral.

Film
In 1936 Augustus was the subject of a Polish-German film Augustus the Strong directed by Paul Wegener. Augustus was portrayed by the actor Michael Bohnen.

Illegitimate issue
The Electress Christiane, who remained Protestant and refused to move to Poland with her husband, preferred to spend her time in the mansion in Pretzsch on the Elbe, where she died.

Augustus, a voracious womanizer, never missed his wife, spending his time with a series of mistresses:
1694–1696 with Countess Maria Aurora von Königsmarck
1696–1699 with Countess Anna Aloysia Maximiliane von Lamberg
1698–1704 with Ursula Katharina of Altenbockum, later Princess of Teschen
1701–1706 with Maria Aurora, later married von Spiegel, a woman of Turkish origin captured as a toddler named Fatima at the Siege of Buda (1686) and brought up in Sweden as the goddaughter of Maria Aurora von Königsmarck
1704–1713 with Anna Constantia von Brockdorff, later Countess of Cosel
1706–1707 with Henriette Rénard
1708 with Angélique Debargues, French dancer and actress
1713–1719 with Maria Magdalena of Bielinski, by her first marriage Countess of Dönhoff and by the second Princess Lubomirska
1720–1721 with Erdmuthe Sophie of Dieskau, by marriage of Loß
1721–1722 with Baroness Kristiane of Osterhausen, by marriage of Stanisławski

Some contemporary sources, including Wilhelmine of Bayreuth, claimed that Augustus had as many as 365 or 382 children. The number is extremely difficult to verify. Perhaps the number refers not to the king's children but to the nights that he spent with his mistresses. Augustus officially recognised only a tiny fraction of that number as his bastards (the mothers of these "chosen ones", with the possible exception of Fatima and Angélique Debargues, were all aristocratic ladies):

With Maria Aurora von Königsmarck
 Hermann Maurice (Goslar, 28 October 1696Château de Chambord, 30 November 1750), Count of Saxony.

With Ursula Katharina of Altenbockum
 Johann Georg (21 August 170425 February 1774), Chevalier de Saxe, later Governor of Dresden.

With Maria Aurora von Spiegel (originally Fatima)
 Frederick Augustus (Warsaw/Dresden [?], 19 June 1702Pillnitz, 16 March 1764), Count Rutowsky
 Maria Anna Katharina (1706–1746), Countess Rutowska; married firstly in January 1728 to Michał, Count Bieliński, divorced in early 1732; secondly, in February 1732, to Claude Marie Noyel, Comte du Bellegarde et d'Entremont.

With Anna Constantia von Brockdorff
 Augusta Anna Constantia (24 February 17083 February 1728), Countess of Cosel; married on 3 June 1725 to Heinrich Friedrich, Count of Friesen
 Fredericka Alexandrine (27 October 17091784), Countess of Cosel; married on 18 February 1730 to Jan Kanty, Count Moszyński
 Frederick Augustus (27 August 171215 October 1770), Count of Cosel; married on 1 June 1749 to Countess Friederike Christiane of Holtzendorff. They had four children. The two sons, Gustav Ernst and Segismund, died unmarried. One of the two daughters, Constantia Alexandrina, married Johann Heinrich, Lehnsgraf Knuth. The other, named Charlotte, first married Count Rudolf of Bünau and then married Charles de Riviere.

With Henriette Rénard
 Anna Karolina (26 November 1707Avignon, 27 September 1769), Countess Orzelska; married on 10 August 1730 to Karl Ludwig Frederick of Schleswig-Holstein-Sonderburg-Beck. They divorced in 1733.

Royal titles
In 
English translation: Augustus II, by the grace of God, King of Poland, Grand Duke of Lithuania, Ruthenia, Prussia, Masovia, Samogitia, Livonia, Kiev, Volhynia, Podolia, Podlachia, Smolensk, Severia and Chernihiv, and Hereditary Duke and Elector of Saxony, etc.

Ancestry

Portraits by
 Rosalba Carriera
 Louis de Silvestre

See also
 History of Saxony
 History of Poland (1569–1795)
 Rulers of Saxony
 List of Lithuanian rulers
 Dresden Castle – Residence of Augustus II the Strong

Notes

References

External links
 

|-

|-

1670 births
1733 deaths
17th-century Polish monarchs
18th-century Polish monarchs
Burials at Dresden Cathedral
Burials at Wawel Cathedral
Converts to Roman Catholicism from Lutheranism
Prince-electors of Saxony
German Lutherans
German monarchs
German Roman Catholics
Grand Dukes of Lithuania
House of Wettin
Imperial vicars
Knights of the Golden Fleece
Nobility from Dresden
People of the Great Turkish War
Polish people of the Great Northern War
Polish people of German descent
Polish Roman Catholics
Rosicrucians
Meissen porcelain
Albertine branch
German art collectors
18th-century art collectors
 
Recipients of the Order of the White Eagle (Poland)